Sophora raivavaeensis is a species of flowering plant in the family Fabaceae, that is endemic to French Polynesia.

References

raivavaeensis
Flora of French Polynesia
Endangered plants
Taxonomy articles created by Polbot